Stoneyisland Man is the name given to a bog body discovered in the Stoneyisland Bog, Gortanumera, County Galway, Ireland on 13 May 1929.

Discovery
Turf-cutters James Dolphin, Thomas Rodgers and John Spain uncovered a human skeleton while working on Dolphin's bank, located towards the centre of Stoneyisland Bog. It was first thought to be the remains of a Mr. Ward of Ballyshrule who had been missing for some time, but it was later revealed to be over five thousand years old.

"It was found lying on its back within a few inches of the marl, at the base of the bog, beneath  of uncut turf. The skeleton was intact with the arms outstretched at right angles to the body. No implements were found with the skeleton, but Mr. Dolphin said at the time that they had previously found tree stumps and ashes at higher depths in the bog. Mr. T. Shea, who was in charge of a section of the Ordnance Survey, operating in the district at the time, examined the remains. He excavated the skeleton and had it examined by Professor Shea of the Anatomical Museum, University College, Galway."

Conclusions of Professor Shea
Professor Shea's conclusions were that "the body [sic] had not sunk slowly down from an originally higher level in the bog, but was lying in the position and at the level where it originally lay." He believed that the outstretched arms indicated that the person had drowned, sank to the bottom of what was then a lake, and the bog grew over it.

His further conclusions were that the body was of a man, aged about forty,  in height. "The lower jaw and teeth, and a large number of the limbs bones were peculiar to prehistoric skeletons in Western Europe. The period of the skeleton was further determined by the degree of flattening of some of the arm and leg bones which are characteristic of skeletons of Neolithic man."

Pollen and peat analysis dated the remains to sometime after 4500 BCE. Several radiocarbon datings dated the remains between 3320–3220 BC.

Books

References

1929 archaeological discoveries
Archaeological sites in County Galway
Bog bodies
Celtic archaeological sites
Deaths by drowning
People from County Galway
Pre-Roman Iron Age